Clapton is a hamlet in the West Berkshire district, in the English county of Berkshire. It is south of the M4 motorway and south of the smaller hamlet of Winding Wood.

References 
AA Street by Street Berkshire (page 130)

Hamlets in Berkshire
Kintbury